Hyunsoonleella udoensis is a Gram-negative, aerobic, rod-shaped and non-motile bacterium from the genus of Hyunsoonleella.

References 

Flavobacteria
Bacteria described in 2016